This article lists NASCAR drivers born outside the United States who have won at least once in any of the top three series (NASCAR Cup Series, Xfinity Series, or Camping World Truck Series). Overall, Australian Marcos Ambrose is the most successful foreign-born driver, in terms of wins, in NASCAR history, having won 7 times overall (2x in Cup, 5x in Xfinity). With his 1st cup win on June 12, 2022, Daniel Suarez became the first foreign-born driver to win on all 3 of NASCAR's national series, and the 35th driver in NASCAR's history to accomplish this feat.

NASCAR Cup Series
 Note: The table is ordered by number of wins, multiple drivers with the same number of wins are ordered by date of first win.

 1 Mario Andretti become a naturalized American citizen in 1964. His birthplace, known as Montona, Italy when he was born in 1940, is now known as Motovun, Croatia.

NASCAR Xfinity Series
 Note: The table is ordered by number of wins, multiple drivers with the same number of wins are ordered by date of first win.

 1 Nelson Piquet Jr. was born in then-West Germany to a Dutch mother and Brazilian father. Piquet Jr. was raised in Brazil.

NASCAR Camping World Truck Series
 Note: The table is ordered by number of wins, multiple drivers with the same number of wins are ordered by date of first win.

See also
List of NASCAR drivers
List of all-time NASCAR Cup Series winners
Road course ringer
Daytona 500

References

Foreign-born race winners